The 26th People's Choice Awards, honoring the best in popular culture for 1999, were held on January 9, 2000, taped live from the Pasadena Civic Auditorium in Pasadena, California. They were hosted by Don Johnson and Cheech Marin, and broadcast on CBS.

Awards
Winners are listed first, in bold.

External links
2000 People's Choice.com

People's Choice Awards
2000 awards in the United States
2000 in California
January 2000 events in the United States